Arthur Griffin (September 12, 1903  —  2001) was an American photographer.

Biography
In the 1920s, he trained as an illustrator. In 1929, he became interested in photography, from the mid-1930s he became a staff photographer for The Boston Globe newspaper, then for Life and Time magazines. He became one of the first photographers in New England to take color photographs - in the 1930s, a color landscape photograph of Griffin was the first to be published in a separate tab for the Saturday Evening Post. At the same time, the first color photo portrait of the then extremely popular baseball player Ted Williams from the Boston Red Sox club appeared in Life.

In 1962, Griffin's first color photo album of New England landscapes was released.

In 1994, one of Griffin's biographers wrote: It's a rare house not to find Griffin's photograph in a telephone directory, calendar, annual report, magazine, or book.

In 1992, a museum of photography created by Griffin at his own expense was opened in Boston, to whose funds he donated his 75,000 photographs, and in 2001, after his death, the Griffin Foundation, which provides grants and scholarships for photographers.

Literature

References

External links 
 
 

1903 births
2001 deaths
Life (magazine) photojournalists
20th-century American photographers
Time (magazine) people
The Boston Globe people
People from Lawrence, Massachusetts